The Martin Luther King Memorial Prize was instituted by novelist John Brunner and his wife and was awarded annually to a literary work published in the US or Britain that was deemed to improve interracial understanding, "reflecting the ideals to which Dr. Martin Luther King dedicated his life". As of 1984, the author of the winning work was awarded £100. Brunner died in 1995, and it is uncertain if the award has continued.

Winners of the prize have included:
 Because They're Black (1972) by Derek Humphry and Gus John
  Black and White: The Negro and English Society (1975) by James Walvin
 A Dry White Season (1980) by André Brink
 In a Dark Time (1984) edited by Nicholas Humphrey and Robert Lifton
 The Heart of the Race: Black Women's Lives in Britain (1985) by Beverley Bryan, Stella Dadzie and Suzanne Scafe
 The European Tribe (1987) by Caryl Phillips
 Behind the Frontlines: Journey into Afro-Britain (1988) by Ferdinand Dennis.
 Parting the Waters: America in the King Years, 1954-63 (1988) by Taylor Branch, 1989 MLK Prize (and 1989 Pulitzer Prize for History)

References

British literary awards